Paoli is a town within Paoli Township and the county seat of Orange County, in the U.S. state of Indiana. The population was 3,677 at the 2010 census.

History
Paoli was laid out and platted in 1816. It was named for Pasquale Paoli Ash, the son of North Carolina governor Samuel Ashe.  A post office has been in operation at Paoli since 1817.

In its first decades, it was noted as a Quaker town that played a role in the Underground Railroad by transporting enslaved people from the South to Canada.  In the 1900s it became known as the site of the Pioneer Mothers Memorial Forest, a surviving fragment of the once-extensive virgin oak forest of southern Indiana.

Thomas Newby Braxtan House, Orange County Courthouse, and Paoli Historic District are listed on the National Register of Historic Places.

Geography
Paoli is located at  (38.557681, -86.469209).

Climate
The climate in this area is characterized by hot, humid summers and generally mild to cool winters.  According to the Köppen Climate Classification system, Paoli has a humid subtropical climate, abbreviated "Cfa" on climate maps.

Demographics

2010 census
As of the census of 2010, there were 3,677 people, 1,484 households, and 923 families living in the town. The racial makeup of the town was 97.7% White, 0.3% African American, 0.2% Native American, 0.3% Asian, 0.5% from other races, and 1.0% from two or more races. Hispanic or Latino of any race were 1.3% of the population.

There were 1,484 households, of which 31.5% had children under the age of 18 living with them, 42.2% were married couples living together, 15.0% had a female householder with no husband present, 5.0% had a male householder with no wife present, and 37.8% were non-families. 32.4% of all households were made up of individuals, and 14% had someone living alone who was 65 years of age or older. The average household size was 2.35 and the average family size was 2.97.

The median age in the town was 39.7 years. 23.8% of residents were under the age of 18; 8.2% were between the ages of 18 and 24; 25.5% were from 25 to 44; 25% were from 45 to 64; and 17.5% were 65 years of age or older. The gender makeup of the town was 48.3% male and 51.7% female.

2000 census
As of the census of 2000, there were 3,844 people, 1,581 households, and 1,013 families living in the town. The racial makeup of the town was 98.34% White, 0.21% African American, 0.23% Native American, 0.18% Asian, 0.18% from other races, and 0.86% from two or more races. Hispanic or Latino of any race were 0.70% of the population.

There were 1,581 households, out of which 31.2% had children under the age of 18 living with them, 49.7% were married couples living together, 11.2% had a female householder with no husband present, and 35.9% were non-families. 32.5% of all households were made up of individuals, and 16.1% had someone living alone who was 65 years of age or older. The average household size was 2.31 and the average family size was 2.90.

In the town, the population was spread out, with 23.7% under the age of 18, 8.7% from 18 to 24, 27.7% from 25 to 44, 21.5% from 45 to 64, and 18.3% who were 65 years of age or older. The median age was 38 years. For every 100 females, there were 91.3 males. For every 100 females age 18 and over, there were 87.2 males.

The median income for a household in the town was $26,962, and the median income for a family was $34,412. Males had a median income of $28,566 versus $20,110 for females. The per capita income for the town was $14,313. About 12.8% of families and 15.1% of the population were below the poverty line, including 15.2% of those under age 18 and 13.3% of those age 65 or over.

Education
The town has a lending library, the Paoli Public Library.

Media

The Paoli News-Republican is a newspaper published weekly in Paoli. It debuted in 1875 and has been printed by Orange County Publishing since its founding. That company was sold to Shurz Communications in August 2018 in a multi-paper acquisition.

Parks and recreation

Paoli Peaks is a ski resort located in Paoli.

Notable people
Sandra Blanton, Democratic member of the Indiana House of Representatives from 2007 to 2011
Margaret Hamilton, developed on-board flight software for the Apollo program
Ken Trinkle, right-handed relief pitcher in Major League Baseball from 1943 to 1949.

References

External links
 Paoli information
 Paoli News Online Edition

Towns in Orange County, Indiana
Towns in Indiana
County seats in Indiana
Populated places on the Underground Railroad